The 2020 Kansas Senate election took place as part of the biennial 2020 United States elections. Kansas voters elected state senators in all of the state's 40 senate districts.

Retirements
Four incumbents did not run for reelection in 2020. Those incumbents are:

Republicans
District 8: Jim Denning: Retiring
District 30: Susan Wagle: Retiring

Democrats
District 7: Barbara Bollier: Retiring; ran for United States Senate
District 18: Vic Miller: Retiring

Incumbents defeated

In primary elections

Republicans
Seven Republicans lost renomination.

District 11: John Skubal lost renomination to Kellie Warren.
District 14: Bruce Givens lost renomination to Michael Fagg.
District 15: Dan Goddard lost renomination to Virgil Peck Jr.
District 20: Eric Rucker lost renomination to Brenda Dietrich.
District 24: Randall Hardy lost renomination to J. R. Claeys.
District 33: Mary Jo Taylor lost renomination to Alicia Straub.
District 34: Ed Berger lost renomination to Mark Steffen.

In the general election

Republican
District 5: Kevin Braun lost to Jeff Pittman.

Democratic
District 19: Anthony Hensley lost to Rick Kloos.

Predictions

Results summary

Close races
Districts where the margin of victory was under 10%:
 District 22, 1.2% 
 District 3, 2.04%
 District 19, 2.42% (flip) 
 District 10, 3.72% 
 District 30, 4.22% 
 District 9, 4.52% 
 District 11, 5.36% 
 District 5, 6.04% (flip) 
 District 23, 6.22% 
 District 28, 8.1% 
 District 8, 8.72% (flip) 
 District 25, 9.18% 
 District 21, 9.58%

Summary of results by State Senate District

References

Senate
Kansas Senate
Kansas Senate elections